PerspectieF –  Christian Union Youth is the youth wing of the ChristianUnion, a Christian democratic political party in the Netherlands.  PerspectieF was founded on 23 September 2000 as a merger between the RPF-jongeren and the Gereformeerd Politiek Jongeren Contact , the youth organisations of the Reformatory Political Federation and the Reformed Political League.

PerspectieF has about 2,300 members in 2006 between 12 and 30 years old and is thus one of the largest political youth organisations in the Netherlands.

In 2004, PerspectieF, together with other Christian political youth organisations from several European countries, started the European Christian Political Youth Network in Kortenberg, in Belgium.

External links
PerspectieF

Christian Union (Netherlands)
Youth wings of political parties in the Netherlands
Organisations based in Utrecht (province)
Amersfoort